SYMP is an obsolete programming language developed by the Control Data Corporation (CDC) for use on the CDC 6000 series computer systems in the 1970s and 1980s.  It was based on a subset of CDCs version of JOVIAL, as an alternative to assembly language.  A number of important CDC software products were implemented in SYMP, including compilers, libraries, a full-screen editor, and major subsystems.

SYMP is a compiled, imperative, and procedural language.  Compared to the Fortran of the day, SYMP supports:

 Stronger data typing - All variables must be declared prior to use,
 Variable bit width integers (both signed and unsigned), boolean variables, and "status" (enumerated integer) variables,
 Data structures - Including "based" dynamically allocated structures.
 Structured programming constructs,
 Nested procedures,
 In-fix "bead" (bit) and character manipulation
 A simple macro facility

A fairly unique feature of SYMP, also found in JOVIAL tables, is that arrays of multi-item variables can be specified with either a "serial" or "parallel" memory layout.  A "serial" layout has array entries following one another in memory as is usual in most computer languages.  A "parallel" layout groups each of the individual items within each of the array entries together.  For example, if each array entry has items x, y, and z, a parallel layout would group x[0]...x[n] together in memory, followed by y[0]...y[n], and then z[0]...z[n].  This has the effect of potentially speeding up access to all the same items across the array - as they are all contiguous with one another.

Simplifications compared to JOVIAL include: no fixed point data type, no table structures, and no COMPOOL concept.  Though in lieu of COMPOOLs, a CDC-specific system text capability allows encapsulation of common data declarations.

External links
 Ninety-nine Bottles of Beer program - written in SYMP
 SYMP coding standard
 SYMP Reference Manual
 SYMP Users Guide

Procedural programming languages
Systems programming languages
Control Data Corporation mainframe software
Programming languages created in the 1970s